The 1932 Copa de Competencia Final was the final that decide the winner of the 1st edition of Copa de Competencia, an Argentine domestic cup organised by dissident body Liga Argentina de Football, the first professional league of Argentina.

The final was held in San Lorenzo de Almagro Stadium on December 4, 1932. River Plate defeated Estudiantes de La Plata 3–1 winning their first Copa de Competencia title.

Qualified teams

Overview 
This first edition was contested by all the 18 teams that took part in the Primera División league season, in a single elimination format. River Plate beat Racing 1–0 at Estadio Gasómetro, Atlanta 4–1 at Platense, Lanús (0–0, 4–3 playoff in semifinals). 

On the other hand, Estudiantes beat Ferro Carril Oeste 5–3 at Racing Stadium, Tigre 3–1 at Huracán, and Huracán 3–1 in semifinals (also at Racing).

Match details

References

c
c
1932 in Argentine football
Football in Buenos Aires